The Preston City Oval is an Australian rules football stadium in Cramer Street in Preston, Victoria, a suburb of Melbourne.  It has a main grandstand and the ground is capable of holding around 5,000 spectators.

The Ground 
The ground was the home of the Preston Football Club in the Victorian Football League, and remained one of its two primary home grounds in the club's final incarnation as the Northern Blues, before the club folded in 2020. It is also the home of the Northern Knights TAC Cup side and the Preston Bullants Junior Football Club. It was also the venue for the Victorian Women's Football League Grand Final in 2007, where a new VWFL crowd record was set.

In the 1960s, the then-VFL's Fitzroy Football Club was interested in moving its base from the Brunswick Street Oval to Preston, owing to a poor relationship with the Fitzroy Cricket Club, and in 1962 it made a request to the Preston Council for a 40-year lease of the venue; but, the council decided that the lease could be granted only if the Fitzroy and Preston football clubs came to agreeable terms, which they did not.

In summer the ground is used by the Preston Cricket Club, who play in the VSDCA as their home ground. The PCC uses the ground for their 1st and 2nd XI as well as the Under 15 RM Hatch Team.

Redevelopment 
In the summer of 2009/10 the ground was redeveloped. Drought tolerant couch grass has been in the summer so that the ground was ready for football season.

References

Victorian Football League grounds
Cricket grounds in Australia
Sport in the City of Darebin
Buildings and structures in the City of Darebin